The Centre d'histoire de la résistance et de la déportation is a museum in Lyon, France.  Located on the former site of a French military health school (École de Santé Militaire) and opened in 1992, it chronicles the French Resistance as well as Jewish deportation in World War II.

The school was occupied by the Germans in the spring of 1943, and used by Lyon's Gestapo chief, Klaus Barbie, to torture resistance members, including Jean Moulin. It was destroyed by allied aircraft on May 26, 1944. The museum itself was inaugurated on October 15, 1992.

This zone is served by the metro line

References

External links
Official site 
Official listing

7th arrondissement of Lyon
Museums in Lyon
World War II museums in France